NGC 407 is an edge-on spiral or lenticular galaxy located in the constellation Pisces. It was discovered on September 12, 1784 by William Herschel. It was described by Dreyer as "very faint, very small, southwestern of 2.", the other being NGC 410.

References

External links
 

0407
17840912
Pisces (constellation)
Discoveries by William Herschel
Spiral galaxies
004190